Wilson Bii (born 9 February 1986) is a visually impaired runner from Kenya, who competes mainly in T11 classification long-distance events.

Athletics career
Bii has represented Kenya at two Summer Paralympics, beginning at London in 2012, there he entered the 5000 metres (T11) event but failed to finish the race. Four years later he attended the 2016 Summer Paralympics in Rio and posted a personal best of 15:22.96 to win the bronze medal in the 5000 metres just behind crowd favourite Odair Santos.

References

Paralympic athletes of Kenya
Paralympic bronze medalists for Kenya
Living people
1986 births
Athletes (track and field) at the 2012 Summer Paralympics
Medalists at the 2016 Summer Paralympics
Athletes (track and field) at the 2016 Summer Paralympics
Kenyan male long-distance runners
Paralympic medalists in athletics (track and field)
Athletes (track and field) at the 2020 Summer Paralympics